The 2013 Texas Tech Red Raiders baseball team represented Texas Tech University during the 2013 NCAA Division I baseball season. The Red Raiders played their home games at Dan Law Field at Rip Griffin Park as a member of the Big 12 Conference. The team was led by head coach Tim Tadlock in his first season as the team's head coach. As of the conclusion of the 2022 season, this is the team's only losing season under Tadlock. 

In March, the team had a 2–1 series win over the Texas Longhorns in Austin. This was the Red Raiders' first series win over Texas in Austin since 2001 and the program's first series win over the Longhorns since 2002.

Previous season
The 2012 baseball team finished the season with a record of 29–26. In Big 12 play, the team finished 7–17, finishing in eighth place tied with Kansas State. The team was not invited to the Big 12 Tournament as Kansas State held the tiebreaker over Texas Tech, having won the regular season series. The 2012 team only won one series in Big 12 play.

Head coach Dan Spencer was fired following the season, finishing his tenure at Texas Tech with an overall record of 115–112 and Big 12 record of 44–61 through four seasons.

Roster

Schedule and results

"#" represents ranking. All rankings from Collegiate Baseball on the date of the contest.
"()" represents postseason seeding in the Big 12 Tournament.

References

Texas Tech Red Raiders
Texas Tech Red Raiders baseball seasons
Texas Tech Baseball